Luis Fernando Díaz Marulanda (born 13 January 1997) is a Colombian professional footballer who plays as a winger for  club Liverpool and the Colombia national team. 

Díaz began his professional career in the Colombian Second Division at Barranquilla, before moving to Atlético Junior, winning Categoría Primera A, one Copa Colombia and one Superliga Colombiana. In 2019, he joined Porto for a reported fee of €7 million, winning two doubles of Primeira Liga and Taça de Portugal, and one Supertaça Cândido de Oliveira. After 14 league goals in 18 league games in the first half of 2021–22, Liverpool signed him in a transfer worth €45 million (£37.5 million). He won the EFL Cup and FA Cup in his first season, and was man of the match in the latter final.

Díaz made his senior international debut for Colombia in 2018. He has earned over 30 caps for his country, helping the national team to a third place finish at the 2021 Copa América, and being awarded the Golden Boot as joint top goalscorer of the tournament alongside Argentina's Lionel Messi.

Club career

Atlético Junior
Díaz was born in Barrancas, La Guajira, and began playing football at the age of six. Nicknamed "Luchito", he attended a small football school run by his father. In 2014, at the age of 17, he attended an open trial hosted by Atlético Junior and impressed enough to join the youth team.
He was included in Colombia's 22-man squad for the 2015 Copa Americana de Pueblos Indígenas, due to his Wayuu ethnicity. After impressing during the tournament, he joined the senior team of Atlético Junior in 2016, being immediately assigned to farm team Barranquilla. Given Díaz's slender build and a potentially malnourished appearance, he was given a dietary plan by Barranquilla to gain 10 kg.

Díaz made his senior debut on 26 April 2016, coming on as a second-half substitute in a 2–1 Categoría Primera B home loss against Deportivo Pereira. His first senior goal came on 14 May, as he scored the winner in a 2–1 home defeat of Cúcuta Deportivo.

On 6 June 2017, after already making his first team debut in the year's Copa Colombia, Díaz was subsequently promoted to Junior's main squad. He made his Categoría Primera A debut on 27 August, replacing Matías Mier in a 3–2 loss at Once Caldas, and scored his first goal on 20 September in a 3–1 Copa Sudamericana home win against Cerro Porteño.

Díaz became a regular starter during the 2018 season, and scored his first goal in the top tier on 4 February of that year, by netting the game's only in a home success over Atlético Bucaramanga. He also added braces against Once Caldas, Atlético Huila and Rionegro Águilas, ending the campaign with 16 goals overall.

Porto

Transfer
On 10 July 2019, Díaz signed for Portuguese club FC Porto on a five-year contract, with the club buying 80% of his economic rights for a fee of €7 million. Zenit Saint Petersburg had also wanted to sign him, but he was convinced otherwise by compatriot former Porto players Radamel Falcao and James Rodríguez, as well as his then national team coach Carlos Queiroz. Díaz also admitted that prior to his Porto move, he had signed a pre-contract with Cardiff City, but the move never materialised.

2019–21: Development and adaptation to Portugal
Díaz made his debut on 7 August in a 1–0 win at Krasnodar in the UEFA Champions League first qualifying round first leg as a 55th-minute substitute for Romário Baró, and six days later in the return game he scored his first goal, albeit in a 3–2 loss at the Estádio do Dragão. Domestically, he made his Primeira Liga debut on 10 August in a 2–1 loss at Gil Vicente as a substitute, and a week later scored for the first to wrap up a 4–0 home win against Vitória de Guimarães as a starter. In November, he, Mateus Uribe, Agustín Marchesín and Renzo Saravia were suspended from the derby against Boavista for having partied the night before.

In his first season in Portugal, Díaz totalled 50 appearances and 14 goals as Porto won the league and the Taça de Portugal. In the final of the latter on 1 August 2020, he was sent off after 38 minutes in a 2–1 win over Benfica at the Estádio Cidade de Coimbra. On 21 October 2020, he scored his first UEFA Champions League goal on his debut in a 1–3 defeat against Manchester City in the 2020–21 season.

On 23 December, Díaz came on as a 77th-minute substitute for Mehdi Taremi in the 2020 Supertaça Cândido de Oliveira against O Clássico rivals Benfica, and scored to confirm a 2–0 win. The following 10 February, he was sent off in a 1–1 draw at Braga in a cup semi-final for unintentionally breaking David Carmo's leg; compatriot Uribe was also dismissed.

2021–22: Breakthrough and departure
On 11 September 2021, Díaz scored in a 1–1 away draw against rivals Sporting CP. On 9 October, he scored the only goal of a 1–0 UEFA Champions League group stage win over A.C. Milan.

With two goals in a 4–0 win over Moreirense on 1 November, he reached five goals in his first six league games, best in the league; 27 days later he scored his tenth, a long-range effort in the 2–1 victory over Vitória de Guimarães; this goal earned him the Primeira Liga Goal of the Month award. His performances led to him being also named the league's Player of the Month and Forward of the Month for October and November.

On 19 December, Díaz was named the league's Forward of the Month for the second consecutive month, after scoring four goals and providing three assists. Despite leaving Porto halfway through his final season, he was the joint seventh top scorer with 14 goals. He, Sérgio Oliveira and Jesús Manuel Corona, all of whom left in January 2022, were issued with league winners' medals.

Liverpool

On 30 January 2022, Díaz signed a five-year contract at Premier League club Liverpool for a reported €45 million (£37.5 million) with €15 million (£12.5 million) add-ons. Prior to signing for Liverpool, Díaz had attracted interest from Tottenham Hotspur. Upon learning of Tottenham's bid, Liverpool changed their summer plans, and decided to sign Díaz on a permanent deal, after impressing Liverpool's manager Jürgen Klopp.

On 6 February, he made his debut for the club, coming on as a 58th-minute substitute for Curtis Jones in an FA Cup fourth round game at home to Cardiff City. He assisted a goal by Takumi Minamino in the 3–1 win. Thirteen days later, scored his first goal for Liverpool in his second league start for the club, concluding a 3–1 home win over Norwich City at Anfield. On 27 February in the 2022 EFL Cup Final, he played the first 97 minutes of a goalless draw with Chelsea that his team won on penalties.

On 5 April, in the first leg of the quarter-finals, Díaz scored a goal and provided an assist in a 3–1 away win against his former club's rivals Benfica at the Estádio da Luz, as Liverpool won 6–4 on aggregate. He started in the 2022 FA Cup Final against Chelsea, a 6–5 victory on penalties after a goalless draw. Substituted for Roberto Firmino after 98 minutes, he was named Player of the Match.

On 9 October, Díaz came off for Roberto Firmino in the 42nd minute of a game against Arsenal due to an injury.

International career

After representing Colombia at under-20 level in the 2017 South American U-20 Championship, Díaz was called up to the full squad on 27 August 2018, for friendlies against Venezuela and Argentina. He made his full international debut on 11 September, replacing Juan Cuadrado in a 0–0 draw against the latter at the MetLife Stadium in East Rutherford, New Jersey. Díaz scored his first international goal on 26 March 2019, equalising in a 2–1 friendly loss away to South Korea. He was part of Carlos Queiroz' 23-man squad for the 2019 Copa América in Brazil.

Díaz was included in Colombia's squad for the 2021 Copa América. On 23 June, he scored the opening goal in a 2–1 first round loss to hosts Brazil with a bicycle kick, and on 6 July he scored their goal in a semi-final draw against Argentina, which ended in an Argentine victory following a penalty shoot-out. Three days later, he scored twice, including the match-winning goal, in a 3–2 victory over Peru in the third-place match. He ended as joint top goalscorer of the tournament alongside Lionel Messi.

Personal life
Díaz’ brother, Jesús, is also a professional footballer, and currently plays for Porto B. He is of Wayuu origin, making him the first indigenous Colombian to represent Colombia.

Career statistics

Club

International

Scores and results list Colombia's goal tally first, score column indicates score after each Díaz goal.

Honours
Junior
 Categoría Primera A: 2018–II, 2019–I
 Copa Colombia: 2017
 Superliga Colombiana: 2019

Porto
 Primeira Liga: 2019–20, 2021–22
 Taça de Portugal: 2019–20, 2021–22
 Supertaça Cândido de Oliveira: 2020

Liverpool
 FA Cup: 2021–22
 EFL Cup: 2021–22
 FA Community Shield: 2022
 UEFA Champions League runner-up: 2021–22

Individual
 Copa América Golden Boot: 2021
 Copa América Team of the Tournament: 2021
 Copa América Tournament Revelation: 2021
 Primeira Liga Player of the Month: October/November 2021
 Primeira Liga Forward of the Month: October/November 2021, December 2021
 Primeira Liga Goal of the Month: November 2020, October/November 2021
 Primeira Liga Player Fair-Play Prize: 2020–21

References

External links

 Profile at the Liverpool F.C. website
 

1997 births
Living people
People from La Guajira Department
Colombian footballers
Association football wingers
Barranquilla F.C. footballers
Atlético Junior footballers
FC Porto players
Liverpool F.C. players
Categoría Primera B players
Categoría Primera A players
Primeira Liga players
Premier League players
FA Cup Final players
Colombia under-20 international footballers
Colombia international footballers
2019 Copa América players
2021 Copa América players
Colombian expatriate sportspeople in Portugal
Colombian expatriate footballers
Colombian expatriate sportspeople in England
Expatriate footballers in England
Expatriate footballers in Portugal
Colombian people of indigenous peoples descent
Indigenous sportspeople of the Americas
Wayuu people